The  Miss Indiana USA competition is the pageant that selects the representative for the state of Indiana in the Miss USA pageant and the name of the title held by those representatives. This pageant is currently produced by Crown Moxie.

The pageant is currently held in Noblesville and has previously been hosted by Anderson, Michigan City, Indianapolis, Carmel and Fort Wayne.

The most recent placement was Alexis Lete in 2020, who finished 3rd runner-up.

Nine Miss Indiana USA winners have previously held the Miss Indiana Teen USA title and competed at Miss Teen USA and three previously competed in other states (Florida, Georgia and Virginia). Two Miss winners have also competed at Miss America.

The current titleholder is Samantha Paige Toney of Greenwood was crowned on April 10, 2022 at Noblesville High School Auditorium in Noblesville. She represented Indiana at the Miss USA 2022 pageant.

Gallery of titleholders

Results summary

Placements
1st runners-up: Holli Dennis (1981)
2nd runners-up: Elaine Richards (1966), Kelly Lloyd (2002)
3rd runners-up: Jayme Buecher (1978), Alexis Lete (2020)
Top 10/12: Virginia Johnson (1952), Jo Berryman (1975), Holly Roehl (1996), Pratima Yarlagadda (1999), Tashina Kastigar (2003), Brittany Mason  (2008)
Top 16/19/20: Cecilia Dennis (1954), Sue Ekamp (1962), Jillian Wunderlich (2011), Mekayla Diehl (2014)

Indiana holds a record of 15 placements at Miss USA.

Special awards
Miss Photogenic: Gretchen Reece (2015)
Miss Congeniality: Tate Fritchley (2019)
Best State Costume: Heather Gray (1992)

Winners

Color key

References

External links
Official website
Miss USA official website

Indiana
Indiana culture
Recurring events established in 1952
Women in Indiana
Annual events in Indiana
1952 establishments in Indiana